Simoselaps anomalus, also known as the northern desert banded snake, is a species of venomous burrowing snake that is endemic to Australia.

Description
The species grows to an average of about 25 cm in length.

Behaviour
The species is oviparous, with an average clutch size of three.

Distribution and habitat
The species’ range covers a broad swathe of arid inland Australia from north-western South Australia and the south-west of the Northern Territory, across Western Australia to the north-western coast of the continent. The type locality is the Hermannsburg Mission, on the upper Finke River, Northern Territory.

References

 
anomalus
Snakes of Australia
Endemic fauna of Australia
Reptiles of the Northern Territory
Reptiles of South Australia
Reptiles of Western Australia
Taxa named by Richard Sternfeld
Reptiles described in 1919